Nueva Italia is the name of towns in the following countries;

Mexico
Nueva Italia, Michoacán

Paraguay
Nueva Italia, Paraguay